The cuneiform sign hal, is a common-use sign in the Epic of Gilgamesh, the Amarna letters, and other cuneiform texts, for example Hittite texts. Its common usage is syllabic for hal, but could also be use for alphabetic h or l, or the a, and for the other three vowels of e, i, or u.

Epic of Gilgamesh usage
Cuneiform hal has a single usage in the Epic of Gilgamesh, for hal. The usage is: hal, 11 times.

In the Epic of Gilgamesh, the most common usage of hal, at the beginning of words spelled "hal-" in the glossary, is for Akkadian halāqu, English, to disappear, to cause to be lost; in the Amarna letters it is used to refer to city-states, or towns, lost to the Hapiru.

In the Epic, two other words use hal at the beginning of their spellings, halbu, for English forest, three times in the Epic, Tablets VII, IV, and II. One spelling of halāpu, (English, "to clothe"), of four spellings, uses hal, Tablet IV, line 196, ú-hal-lip.

Amarna letters usage
One main usage in the Amarna letters, is for the Akkadian language word halāqu, referring to the capturing of city-states, or towns, (Amarna letter EA 288).

References

Moran, William L. 1987, 1992. The Amarna Letters. Johns Hopkins University Press, 1987, 1992. 393 pages.(softcover)
 Parpola, 1971. The Standard Babylonian Epic of Gilgamesh, Parpola, Simo, Neo-Assyrian Text Corpus Project, c 1997, Tablet I thru Tablet XII, Index of Names, Sign List, and Glossary-(pp. 119–145), 165 pages.
Rainey, 1970. El Amarna Tablets, 359-379, Anson F. Rainey, (AOAT 8, Alter Orient Altes Testament 8, Kevelaer and Neukirchen -Vluyen), 1970, 107 pages.

Cuneiform signs